Đorđe Vujadinović (Serbian Cyrillic: Ђорђе Вујадиновић; 29 November 1909 – 5 October 1990) was a Serbian international football player and manager.

Club career
He was born in Kolari, a suburb of Smederevo, but still very young, came to Belgrade to live with his uncle. While playing football with his friends in a sandy field in the Kalemegdan Park in the center of the city, he was spotted by an "older serious man with hat" who invite him, together with other two boys, to come and make tests in, the biggest club from that period, BSK. He passed, and joined the youth team, in which played a wonderful generation of players, in which Tirnanić, Valjarević, Krčevinac, Zloković and he made the forward line, that will be, some years later, the attack of the BSK team that won many Championships in the 1930s. Those late 1920s were years of great expansion in the Yugoslav Kingdom and football was starting to be extremely popular. In those times, the players started to be professionalized and started to be paid monetarily, but he refused, saying that his earnings as a bank employee were enough for him and that he played football only by pleasure. This is a great example of his calm and honest character. Until 1940 he played about 400 matches for the club, was national Champion five times and twice a league top-scorer.

He was the only BSK player to win all five national titles.

International career
Before the World War II, the Yugoslav team was unimaginable without him in the squad. Between 1929 and 1940 he played 44 international matches, and did not play more because of his duties as a bank functioner. He was one of the main players of the Yugoslavia national football team in the 1930 FIFA World Cup, and scored a total of 18 goals for the national team.

International goals
Yugoslavia's goal tally first

Managerial career
After returning from captivity, in the end of the Second World War, he ended his playing career and dedicates to the work with the younger generations. He starts coaching the youth teams of FK Partizan and latter OFK Beograd, where he also managed the senior team in 1960–61. He was also the manager of the Yugoslavia national under-21 football team and Altay S.K. While in a zenith of his managerial time, he invited Mr. Miljan Miljanić (the latter President of the Yugoslav Football Federation), and with who had already worked before, to substitute him in the job.

Honours

Club
BSK Beograd
Yugoslav First League Champion: 1930–31, 1932–1933, 1934–35, 1935–36 and 1938–39
Yugoslav First League top-scorer: 1929 (with 10 goals in 8 matches) and 1930–31 (with 12 goals in 10 matches)

Country
Yugoslavia
1930 FIFA World Cup semi-finalist

Trivia
He was nicknamed "Leteći fudbaler", translated to English "The flying footballer". This nickname was because during the last years he played with BSK he also worked as an employee in the National Bank of Yugoslavia, so as his work did not allow him to take numerous absences, when the club played away he did not travel earlier with the rest of the team, but he rather departed from Belgrade in last moments by airplane in order to come in time to the match.

References

External links
 Profile in Serbian Federation website
 

1909 births
Serbian footballers
Yugoslav footballers
Yugoslavia international footballers
Yugoslav First League players
OFK Beograd players
1930 FIFA World Cup players
1990 deaths
Association football forwards
Serbian football managers
Yugoslav football managers
OFK Beograd managers
Altay S.K. managers
Sportspeople from Smederevo